John Welch (born February 17, 1963) is an American professional basketball coach and former player who most recently served as assistant coach for the Los Angeles Clippers of the National Basketball Association (NBA). He played professionally in New Zealand where in 1988, he earned Most Outstanding Guard and All-Star Five honors playing for Waitemata. Throughout his coaching career, he has worked with or worked under various notable basketball people, including Jerry Tarkanian, Jerry West, Hubie Brown, George Karl and Tim Grgurich.

Early life
Born in Portland, Maine, Welch attended Rancho High School in North Las Vegas, Nevada and was an All-State selection. He later played college basketball for Nevada and UNLV before starting a successful coaching career.

Coaching career

Fresno State
At Fresno State, Welch worked under head coach Jerry Tarkanian, a 2013 Naismith Memorial Basketball Hall of Fame coach inductee.

Denver Nuggets
Welch worked under George Karl during his tenure with the Denver Nuggets. Karl expressed his appreciation towards Welch, saying, "he's got great passion ... [and] tries something every day that we can get better at."

Brooklyn Nets
Welch began his tenure with the Nets in 2013, the first season Jason Kidd was head coach.

Sacramento Kings
On July 31, 2015, Welch was hired by the Sacramento Kings to be an assistant coach.

Los Angeles Clippers
On September 23, 2016, Welch was hired as an assistant coach by the Los Angeles Clippers, and served in the position until November 16, 2020.

References

External links
 NBA.com bio
 John Welch is Denver Nuggets' workaholic assistant coach

1963 births
Living people
American expatriate basketball people in New Zealand
American men's basketball players
Basketball coaches from Maine
Basketball coaches from Nevada
Basketball players from Maine
Basketball players from Nevada
Brooklyn Nets assistant coaches
Denver Nuggets assistant coaches
Fresno State Bulldogs men's basketball coaches
Guards (basketball)
High school basketball coaches in the United States
Long Beach State Beach men's basketball coaches
Nevada Wolf Pack men's basketball players
People from North Las Vegas, Nevada
Sportspeople from the Las Vegas Valley
Sportspeople from Portland, Maine
UNLV Runnin' Rebels basketball players